Alverca do Ribatejo e Sobralinho is a civil parish in the municipality of Vila Franca de Xira, Portugal. It was formed in 2013 by the merger of the former parishes Alverca do Ribatejo and Sobralinho. The population in 2011 was 36,120, in an area of 23.92 km².

References

Freguesias of Vila Franca de Xira